Lothar Debes (21 June 1890 – 14 July 1960) was a German SS leader during the Nazi era. He commanded the SS Division Nord and the SS Division Frundsberg during World War II.

See also
List SS-Gruppenführer

Sources
 Mark C. Yerger,  Waffen-SS Commanders: The Army, Corps and Divisional Leaders of a Legend : Augsberger to Kreutz, Atglen: Schiffer Publishing (October 1997). , .

1890 births
1960 deaths
People from Eichstätt (district)
People from the Kingdom of Bavaria
German Army personnel of World War I
Military personnel from Bavaria
SS-Gruppenführer
Recipients of the clasp to the Iron Cross, 1st class
Waffen-SS personnel